Silvisaurus, from the Latin silva "woodland" and Greek sauros "lizard", is a nodosaurid ankylosaur from the  Early to Late Cretaceous period.

Discovery and species
A fossil of the species was discovered in the fifties by rancher Warren H. Condray of Wells, KS. He notified senator Frank Carlson who directed him to the chancellor of the University of Kansas, Franklin David Murphy. Murphy sent the preparator of the paleontology of vertebrates department of the natural history museum of the university, Russell R. Camp, to investigate the matter. In July 1955 Camp, with help from Condray, recovered the skeleton of a dinosaur. It was further prepared by Camp and Glenn H. Marihugh. In 1961 the find was described and named by Theodore H. Eaton jr., also from the University of Kansas, as the type species Silvisaurus condrayi. The generic name is derived from Latin silva, "wood", in reference to the probably densely forested habitat of the animal. The specific name honours Condray. To date, Silvisaurus includes only the type species.

The holotype, KU 10296, was found in exposures of the Terracota Clay Member of the Dakota Formation (late Albian-early Cenomanian) in Kansas, and consists of an incomplete skeleton with skull. It includes the mandible, eight neck vertebrae, ten dorsal vertebrae, a sacrum of six sacral vertebrae, three tail vertebrae, a left pubis fragment, the lower end of the right femur, and a toe phalanx. Additionally disarticulated plates and spikes from the body armour were discovered. The condition of the fossil was poor as the bones had been exposed at the bottom of a dry riverbed and had been weathered and trampled by cattle. Some elements were only present as impressions or natural casts.

Paleobiology
 
The bony secondary palate is poorly developed in Silvisaurus, the dentary includes at least twenty-five teeth, the basal tubera of the basioccipital are bulbous, and each premaxilla holds eight to nine teeth.

The presence of teeth at the front of the jaw suggests that this may have been a relatively primitive nodosaur, since most later forms had a toothless beak instead. In addition to the usual rounded and polygonal osteoderms, Silvisaurus may have also sported bony spines on its shoulders and tail. The head contained large air passages, which may have been used for loud vocalisations, presumably for communication.

Classification
This taxon represents a relatively primitive nodosaurid, and Vickaryous et al. (2004) have stated that "Sauropelta edwardsorum, Silvisaurus condrayi, and Pawpawsaurus campbelli form a basal polytomy nested deep to Cedarpelta."

See also

 Timeline of ankylosaur research

References

Vickaryous, Maryanska, and Weishampel 2004. Chapter Seventeen: Ankylosauria. in The Dinosauria (2nd edition), Weishampel, D. B., Dodson, P., and Osmólska, H., editors. University of California Press.

Nodosaurids
Late Cretaceous dinosaurs of North America
Fossil taxa described in 1960
Paleontology in Kansas
Ornithischian genera